Mercurialis  is a genus of plants in the family Euphorbiaceae, the spurges, known commonly as the mercuries. These are slender herbs (forbs), rhizomatious perennials and woody perennials, native to Europe, North Africa, and Asia.

Species
 Mercurialis annua L. – most of Europe, North Africa, the Middle East (from Turkey to Iran and Qatar), and islands of the eastern Atlantic (Canary Islands, Azores, Madeira, etc.)
 Mercurialis canariensis Obbard & S.A.Harris – Canary Islands
 Mercurialis corsica Coss. & Kralik – Corsica, Sardinia
 Mercurialis elliptica Lam. – Spain, Portugal, Morocco
 Mercurialis huetii Hanry – Spain, France, Morocco
 Mercurialis leiocarpa Siebold & Zucc. – China, Japan, Korea, Ryukyu Islands, Thailand, Assam, Bhutan, Nepal
 Mercurialis × longifolia Lam. – Spain, Portugal, France   (M. annua × M. tomentosa)
 Mercurialis ovata Sternb. & Hoppe – C + E Europe and SW Asia from Germany + Italy to Russia + Syria
 Mercurialis × paxii Graebn. – C + E Europe from Germany to Crimea  (M. ovata × M. perennis)
 Mercurialis perennis L. – most of Europe plus Algeria, Caucasus, Turkey, Iran
 Mercurialis reverchonii Rouy – Spain, Morocco
 Mercurialis tomentosa L. – Spain, Portugal, France, Balearic Islands

formerly included
transferred to other genera (Acalypha Adenocline Claoxylon Leidesia Micrococca Seidelia Speranskia )

References

External links

Jepson Manual Treatment
GRIN Genus Profile

Acalypheae
Euphorbiaceae genera
Taxa named by Carl Linnaeus